Guillermo Stevens Sierra (born 22 April 1960) is a Mexican tennis coach and former professional player. He is also known by his nickname "Memo".

Stevens was a collegiate tennis player for UT Austin prior to joining the professional tour, where he attained a career high ranking of 302 in the world. He was runner-up at the inaugural San Luis Potosí Challenger in 1980, qualified for the main draw of the 1982 Bordeaux Open and featured in the qualifiers for the 1983 Wimbledon Championships.

References

External links
 
 

1960 births
Living people
Mexican male tennis players
Texas Longhorns men's tennis players